Consort Ui may refer to:

Yasokjin (died 1316), wife of Chungseon of Goryeo
Royal Noble Consort Uibin Seong (1753–1786), concubine of Jeongjo of Joseon